Murderdolls is an American horror punk and metal band. Their discography currently consists of two studio albums, two compilation albums, one extended play, and five singles. These figures do not account for material released by members' side projects.

The Murderdolls first release was an extended play, entitled Right to Remain Violent. It was released in early 2002 on Roadrunner Records. It is considered to be a promotional album for their upcoming studio album. The album consists of three tracks that were later featured on their debut studio album. It did not make it onto any charts.

Their debut album, Beyond the Valley of the Murderdolls, was a studio album, consisting of 15 tracks. It was released in mid-2002 on Roadrunner Records. There were three versions released, the original issue, the limited edition, released in 2003, and the Enhanced DVD. The album peaked at number 40 in the UK, 102 in the US, and 144 in France.

Their second album, Women & Children Last was a studio album consisting of 14 tracks. It was released in August 2010.

The three singles they released include "Dead in Hollywood", "White Wedding", and "My Dark Place Alone". "Dead in Hollywood" peaked at 54 on the UK charts. "White Wedding" peaked at 24 on the same chart.

Albums

Studio albums

Compilation albums

Extended plays

Singles

Other appearances

Music videos

References 

Discography
Heavy metal group discographies
Punk rock group discographies
Discographies of American artists